The Indian cricket team toured England in the 1996 cricket season. They played a total of eighteen matches, including three Tests and three One Day Internationals (ODIs) against England. In the Tests and ODIs, India were captained by Mohammad Azharuddin, while Michael Atherton captained England.

This tour saw Sourav Ganguly, Rahul Dravid and Venkatesh Prasad make their Test debuts. Prasad made his debut in the 1st Test at Edgbaston, taking six wickets in this match and ultimately finishing as the leading wicket-taker in the Test series with 16. Ganguly and Dravid made their debuts in the 2nd Test at Lord's, scoring 131 and 95 respectively; both would go on to become mainstays of the Indian batting as well as national captains. The team also included established players such as Azharuddin, Sachin Tendulkar, Anil Kumble, Javagal Srinath, Sanjay Manjrekar and Nayan Mongia.

Nonetheless, the tour was a disaster for India. The team lost the Test series 1–0 (with the last two matches drawn), and the ODI series 2–0 (with no result in the first match due to rain). The rest of the tour saw victories in a single-innings match against the Duke of Norfolk's XI and limited-overs matches against an England National Cricket Association XI and Middlesex, but also defeats in a limited-overs match against Northamptonshire and a first-class match against Derbyshire. The tour was also marred by a spat between Azharuddin and opener Navjot Singh Sidhu, which resulted in the latter walking out of the tour after the 2nd ODI. Following the tour, Azharuddin, who was also facing personal problems at the time, was sacked as captain.

Tour matches

Three-day: British Universities v Indians

Three-day: Hampshire v Indians

Test series

1st Test

2nd Test

3rd Test

 July 7 was taken as a rest day and is to date the last test match in England to feature a rest day.

ODI series

1st ODI

2nd ODI

3rd ODI

References

External sources
 CricketArchive – tour itineraries

Annual reviews
 Playfair Cricket Annual 1997
 Wisden Cricketers' Almanack 1997

Further reading
 Ramachandra Guha, A Corner of a Foreign Field - An Indian History of a British Sport, Picador, 2001

1996 in English cricket
1996
International cricket competitions from 1994–95 to 1997
May 1996 sports events in the United Kingdom
June 1996 sports events in the United Kingdom
July 1996 sports events in the United Kingdom